Dr. Hasan Rangerz (born March 21, 1980) is a former wrestler, coach and sports manager from Iran.  He is the head coach of Iran's national wrestling team and the official instructor of the World Wrestling Federation.  Before that, Rangers was the director of the national wrestling teams of Iran, the spokesperson of the Iranian Wrestling Federation and the general director of Mazandaran Sports and Youth  and other executive responsibilities, including the advisor to the vice president and the advisor to the head of the physical education organization from 2008 to 2010, the head of the general department of education development.  He has had the basic and talent search of the Ministry of Sports, the management of the National Museum of Sports, Olympics and Paralympics, and the vice president of the Wrestling Federation.

Rangers, as a phenomenon of wrestling in Iran and the world, in the 2001 World Wrestling Championship, with a decisive victory against their opponents and contenders such as Cuban Lazaro Rivas, silver medal winner of the 2000 Sydney Olympics, and American Brandon Pelson, silver winner of the 1996 Atlanta Olympics, for the first time after the Islamic Revolution.  won the world gold medal for Iranian wrestling.  He also won the bronze medal at the 2002 World Championship and the gold medal at the World University Championship the following year, and was selected by Fila as the most technical freestyle wrestler in the world in 2001 and 2002, which holds the record for winning this award.  In 2002, Rangers was recognized as the country's sportsman of the year and in 2003, the sportsman of the year was

education:

Bachelor of Public Administration - Islamic Azad University, Chalous branch.

Master's degree in political science - Islamic Azad University, Chalous branch.

Master's degree in physical education and sports science, management and planning in sports - University of Tehran.

Ph.D. in Physical Education and Sports Sciences, Department of Sports Management and Planning, Islamic Azad University, Research Sciences Branch, Tehran.

work experience :

In 2013, Hassan Rengarz was elected as the vice president of the Asian Wrestling Council.

On 29 September 2019, Rengarz was appointed as the General Director of Sports and Youth of Mazandaran.

References

External links
 

1980 births
Living people
Wrestlers at the 2000 Summer Olympics
Iranian male sport wrestlers
Wrestlers at the 2004 Summer Olympics
Olympic wrestlers of Iran
World Wrestling Championships medalists
Universiade medalists in wrestling
Universiade silver medalists for Iran
People from Nowshahr
Medalists at the 2005 Summer Universiade
Asian Wrestling Championships medalists
Sportspeople from Mazandaran province
20th-century Iranian people
21st-century Iranian people
World Wrestling Champions